Herbert Eatton Todd (22 February 1908 – 25 February 1988) was an English writer of children's fiction. His "Bobby Brewster" stories also featured on television and could be dialled on the telephone.

Personal life
Herbert Eatton Todd was born on 22 February 1908 in Westminster, the son of Henry Graves Todd, an elementary schoolteacher, and Minnie Helen Elizabeth Todd (née Boyles). In a foreword to his 1978 novella Changing of the Guard, he stated that he was living at 206 Buckingham Palace Road, Westminster, which the protagonist visits.

Todd married Joyce Hughes in 1933 in Berkhamstead, Hertfordshire, where he lived for the rest of his life.

Writing
Todd is best known for his "Bobby Brewster" children's books. Often the stories would have common household items suddenly come to life and chat to young Bobby Brewster and his comrade Tom McCleery.

He was a storyteller as well as author, usually telling stories of his own invention. He visited many schools to give storytelling sessions; see the reference below for people's memories of his school sessions. He also visited many teacher training colleges to give sessions about storytelling.

In 1969 and 1970, he appeared on BBC's long-running children's television show Jackanory reading several Bobby Brewster stories. Unlike other episodes of Jackanory, these were recorded in front of an audience of schoolchildren.

The Bobby Brewster stories were also offered as a dial-and-listen "bedtime story" service by British Telecom in the 1980s, where children could dial a three-digit BT number and listen to a looped voice recording of a selected Bobby Brewster story every evening.

Bobby Brewster books
Most of these books contain several short stories with simple black line illustrations, most of them by Lillian Buchanan (1914–2004). There is a list of the individual stories in most of the books below.

Bobby Brewster and the Winkers' Club (1949)
Bobby Brewster (1954)
Bobby Brewster Bus Conductor (1955)
Bobby Brewster's Bicycle (1957)
Bobby Brewster's Camera (1959)
Bobby Brewster's Wallpaper (1961)
Bobby Brewster's Conker (1963)
Bobby Brewster, Detective (1964)
Bobby Brewster's Potato (1964)
Bobby Brewster and the Ghost (1966)
Bobby Brewster's Kite (1967)
Bobby Brewster's Scarecrow (1968)
Bobby Brewster's Torch (1969)
Bobby Brewster's Balloon Race (1970)
Bobby Brewster's Typewriter (1971)
Bobby Brewster's Bee (1972)
Bobby Brewster's Bookmark (1975)
Bobby Brewster's First Fun (1976)
Bobby Brewster's Wishbone (1977)
Bobby Brewster's Lamp Post (1982)
Bobby Brewster's Hiccups  (1985)
Bobby Brewster's Old Van (1986)
Bobby Brewster and the Magic Handyman (1987)
Bobby Brewster's Jigsaw Puzzle (1988)

Other books
H. E. Todd met Val Biro, author and illustrator of the Gumdrop books, at a storytelling session. They collaborated on several picture books, with stories by Todd and illustrated by Val Biro. Most of them had originally appeared in one of the books listed above.

Sick Cow
Jungle Silver (1981)
Santa's Big Sneeze (1986)
The Sleeping Policeman (1988?)
The Very Very Very Long Dog
The Big Sneeze
The Clever Clever Cats
Scruffy, Scruffy Dog
The Crawly Crawly Caterpillar
Tiny, Tiny Tadpole
The Roundabout Horse
The Tiger Who Couldn't Be Bothered
The Silly Silly Ghost
Changing of the Guard
King of Beasts
George the Fire-Engine

List of stories
Here is a list of stories for most of the books that contained several stories.

Bobby Brewster and the Winkers' Club
Winkers' Club
Cuckoo Clock
Milkman's Horse
Teddy Bear
Percy's Perkies
The King of Beasts
The Blinking Owl
Bobby Brewster (1954)
The spoon on holiday
The telephone
The sick cow
The magic wristwatch
The spider
A pair of braces
Mysterious Manton
The walking pyjamas
Bobby Brewster Bus Conductor (1955)
The bus conductor
The echo
The wireless set
A funny thing happened
The Chairlegsbury Railway
Up the wall
The nut
Silly shoes
Bobby Brewster's Bicycle (1957)
Bobby Brewster's bicycle
Mr Limcano's geography lesson
Knights in armour
Snake belt
The lawn-mower and the worms
The wonderful alarm clock
Bobby Brewster's special telephone
Bobby Brewster's Camera (1959)
The camera that clicks twice
The extraordinary snapshot
Chicken-pox for four
'Go and wash your hands'
The funny green hair
Magic cricket
Mr Frederick Whyte and family
Bobby Brewster's Wallpaper (1961)
Bobby Brewster's wallpaper
The ball that bounced sideways
Mr Limcano's magic sums
An elephant never forgets
Please shut the gate
Covered with spots
Bobby Brewster's Conker (1963)
Bobby Brewster's conker
The earwig in the clock
Please may I bang the gong?
Timothy Tadpole
The missing MacTavish
West with the wagons
Bobby Brewster Detective (1964)
International Private Investigator
Bread, cheese and pickles
Follow that spider
Pork chops
Don't worry sheep
Dolls are for girls
Plum pudding dog
School pantomime
Bobby Brewster's Potato (1964)
Potato face
Marigolds with a difference
The glove tree
Crazy paving
The Brewster martins
Pigeon in church
Toad in the hole
Busy and Caroline
Bobby Brewster's Ghost (1966)
The fat and jolly ghost
Tail twitch
The indiarubber
The paintbox
Mickey the monkey puppet
Roundabout horse
Unfair to sardines
Six pints, please!
Bobby Brewster's Kite (1967)
The kite
School tie
Penny in the slot
A puffin called Percy
The new library
Six pints, please!
Diesel engine tooter
Bobby Brewster's Scarecrow (1968)
The unscarecrow
Jump out and bite
Letters by return
The Thingamybob
The washing-machine
The squitten
Desk diary
Scrumpistick
Bobby Brewster's Torch (1969)
The flashing torch
Bobby Brewster by a tree
Pirate at the party
Sparrows in the letter-box
Talking to the wind
The suitcase
The think balloons
Undressed and in bed
The whistling golf-ball
Bobby Brewster's Balloon Race (1970)
The balloon race
Letters of the alphabet
Another mince pie
The wobbly tooth
Tooth-paste magic
The village of Castle Crabbe
Bobby Brewster's Typewriter (1971)
The typewriter
Counting sheep
Clothes on the line
What is a weed?
With knobs on
The piece of chalk
The statue
Bobby Brewster's Bee (1972)
Zwarm of beez
Cobwebs in the sky
Chicken soup
Penny for the guy
The birds' concert
The litterbugs
Brown paper parcel
The dustbin
Bobby Brewster's Bookmark (1975)
The bookmark bookworm
Pebble on the beach
Filthy lucre
King of Beasts
Christobel, Christopher and Christina
A car called Charley
Two magic pianos

References

External links

 Bobby Brewster website (currently just a list of books and stories they contain).
H. E Todd on IMDB
Recollections Of H.E. Todd visiting schools

1988 deaths
1908 births
English children's writers
People from Westminster
People from Berkhamsted